Michael Wayne Campbell (born February 1, 1950) is an American guitarist. He was a member of Tom Petty and the Heartbreakers and co-wrote many of the band's hits with Petty, including "Refugee", "Here Comes My Girl", "You Got Lucky", and "Runnin' Down a Dream".  Outside of The Heartbreakers, he has worked as a session guitarist and songwriter with a number of other acts, including composing and playing on the Don Henley hit "The Boys of Summer", as well as working on most of Stevie Nicks's solo albums. Campbell, along with Neil Finn, joined Fleetwood Mac to replace lead guitarist Lindsey Buckingham on their world tour in 2018–2019.  After the end of that tour he has been involved in his own band, The Dirty Knobs, and has released 2 albums, as of 2022. 

On November 11, 2011, Rolling Stone magazine named Mike Campbell to their top 100 guitarists coming in at number 79. He was inducted into the Rock and Roll Hall of Fame in 2002 as a member of Tom Petty and the Heartbreakers.

Early years 
Campbell was born on February 1, 1950, in Panama City, Florida. He grew up there and in Jacksonville, Florida, where he graduated from Jean Ribault High School in 1968. At the age of 16, his mother bought him his first guitar, a Harmony acoustic model which he later described as "unplayable" from a pawnshop. His first electric guitar was a $60 Guyatone, but playing a friend's Gibson SG (a model which Campbell would not own himself for many years) was a transformative experience. Like Tom Petty, Campbell drew his strongest influences from The Byrds and Bob Dylan, with additional inspiration coming from guitarists such as Scotty Moore, Luther Perkins, George Harrison, Carl Wilson, Jerry Garcia, Roger McGuinn, Keith Richards, Brian Jones, Jimmy Page, Mick Taylor, and Neil Young. The first song he learned to play was "Baby Let Me Follow You Down," a song which appeared on Dylan's eponymous debut album. He formed a band named Dead or Alive which quickly disbanded.

Campbell met Tom Petty through drummer Randall Marsh. Marsh was auditioning to be in Petty's band Mudcrutch and learned that Mudcrutch had recently lost their guitarist. He suggested that Petty try Campbell, who was his roommate and had actually been listening to the conversation in the next room. Campbell impressed Petty with his version of Johnny B. Goode and was offered a spot in the band. Mudcrutch became a very popular act around Gainesville and north Florida in the early 1970s. They relocated to Los Angeles in 1974 and signed a record deal with Shelter Records, but released only one poor-selling single and broke up soon after.

Tom Petty & The Heartbreakers 

In 1976, Campbell rejoined Petty to begin Tom Petty and the Heartbreakers with former Mudcrutch member Benmont Tench (keyboards) along with Ron Blair (bass guitar) and Stan Lynch (drums).

Like the other Heartbreakers Campbell avoids the virtuoso approach to playing, preferring to have his work serve the needs of each song.

Campbell co-produced the Heartbreakers albums Southern Accents, Pack Up the Plantation: Live!, Let Me Up (I've Had Enough), Into the Great Wide Open, Songs and Music from "She's the One", Echo, The Last DJ, The Live Anthology and Mojo, as well as the Petty solo albums Full Moon Fever, Wildflowers, and Highway Companion.

Campbell collaborated, recorded, and toured with Tom Petty for almost 50 years. His last live performance with the Heartbreakers was on September 25, 2017, at the Hollywood Bowl in Los Angeles. Tom Petty died unexpectedly about one week later, on October 2.

Side projects 
In 1997 Campbell co-founded the Blue Stingrays with Heartbreakers Benmont Tench & Ron Blair and Mudcrutch member Randall Marsh, and released their one album the same year.

In 2007, he joined a reformed Mudcrutch with Petty, Tench, Marsh, and Tom Leadon; they debuted in 2008 with a tour and an album. The band returned in 2016 for another album and tour before Petty's death.

On April 9, 2018, Fleetwood Mac announced that Campbell would be joining the band along with Neil Finn to replace lead guitarist Lindsey Buckingham for their 2018-19 world tour.

In March 2022, Campbell announced that he had not worked with Fleetwood Mac after 2019, and that he had moved on.

The Dirty Knobs 
While in the Heartbreakers, Campbell was lead singer and guitarist with a side band, the Dirty Knobs, with guitarist Jason Sinay, drummer Matt Laug, and bassist Lance Morrison. "It's rougher-edged [than Petty's material]," Campbell says of the group, "It's slightly over-driven, less polished, lots of Sixties influence: The Kinks, Led Zeppelin, The Animals. It's something I probably should have done a long time ago, but I didn't 'cause I was wrapped up in the Heartbreakers." They released a single, "Feelin' High", in 2010.

The band released the title track from its debut album, Wreckless Abandon, in January 2020, followed by the album itself in November of that year. The album was produced by Campbell and George Drakoulias, who with Tom Petty produced Tom Petty and the Heartbreakers' The Last D.J. The cover art was by Klaus Voormann who created the cover of The Beatles Revolver.

In the summer of 2021 the band released a new single, a cover of J. J. Cale's "Humdinger".

In April 2022 the band released their second album, External Combustion.

Discography

As primary artist

Solo 
 "Unbroken Wing" (2022) from various artist's album For the Birds on which he plays a dulcimer given to him by Stevie Nicks while supporting her on tour.

With Blue Stingrays
 Surf-n-Burn (1997)

With The Dirty Knobs

Albums
 Wreckless Abandon (2020)
 External Combustion (2022)

Singles
 "Feelin' High" (2010)
 "Humdinger" (2021)

Session work 
With Stevie Nicks
 Bella Donna (Atco Records, 1981)
 The Wild Heart (Modern Records, 1983)
 Rock a Little (Modern Records, 1985)
 The Other Side of the Mirror (Modern Records, 1989)
 Street Angel (Modern Records, 1994)
 Trouble in Shangri-La (Reprise Records, 2001)
 In Your Dreams (Reprise Records, 2011)
 24 Karat Gold: Songs from the Vault (Reprise Records, 2014)

With Dwight Twilley
 Jungle (EMI, 1984)

With Don Henley
 Building the Perfect Beast (Geffen, 1984)
 The End of the Innocence (Geffen, 1989)
 Inside Job (Warner Bros. Records, 2000)

With Lone Justice
 Lone Justice (Geffen, 1985)

With Bob Dylan
 Empire Burlesque (Columbia Records, 1985)
 Knocked Out Loaded (Columbia Records, 1986)
 Together Through Life (Columbia Records, 2009)

With Aretha Franklin
 Who's Zoomin' Who? (Arista Records, 1985)

With Melba Moore
 A Lot of Love (Capitol Records, 1986)

With Peter Case
 Peter Case (Geffen, 1986)

With Brian Setzer
 The Knife Feels Like Justice (EMI, 1986)

With Matthew Sweet
 Inside (Sony Music, 1986)

With Stephanie Mills
 If I Were Your Woman (MCA Records, 1987)

With Warren Zevon
 Sentimental Hygiene (Virgin Records, 1987)
 Transverse City (Virgin Records, 1989)
 The Wind (Artemis Records, 2003)

With Williams Brothers
 Two Stories (Warner Bros. Records, 1987)

With Randy Newman
 Land of Dreams (Reprise Records, 1988)

With Roy Orbison
 Mystery Girl (Virgin Records, 1989)

With Tom Petty
 Full Moon Fever (MCA Records, 1989)
 Wildflowers (Warner Bros. Records, 1994)
 Highway Companion (Warner Bros. Records, 2006)

With Paul Carrack
 Groove Approved (Chrysalis Records, 1989)

With Jeffrey Osborne
 Only Human (Arista Records, 1990)

With Roger McGuinn
 Back from Rio (Arista Records, 1991)

With Paula Abdul
 Spellbound (Virgin Records, 1991)

With Jennifer Holliday
 I'm on Your Side (Arista Records, 1991)

With Bob Seger
 The Fire Inside (Capitol Records, 1991)

With John Prine
 The Missing Years (Oh Boy Records, 1991)

With Joe Cocker
 Night Calls (Capitol Records, 1991)

With Tracy Chapman
 Matters of the Heart (Elektra Records, 1992)

With Robin Zander
 Robin Zander (Interscope Records, 1993)

With Michael McDonald
 Blink of an Eye (Reprise Records, 1993)

With Jackson Browne
 I'm Alive (Elektra Records, 1993)
 Looking East (Elektra Records, 1996)

With Christine Lakeland
 Reckoning (Virgin Records, 1993)

With Patti Scialfa
 Rumble Doll (Columbia Records, 1993)

With Randy Crawford
 Naked and True (WEA, 1995)

With Taj Mahal
 Phantom Blues (RCA Victor, 1996)

With The Wallflowers
 Bringing Down the Horse (Interscope Records, 1996)
 Breach (Interscope Records, 2000)

With Johnny Cash
 Unchained (American Recordings, 1996)
 American III: Solitary Man (American Recordings, 2000)
 American IV: The Man Comes Around (American Recordings, 2002)
 American V: A Hundred Highways (American Recordings, 2006)

With Mary J. Blige
 Share My World (MCA Records, 1997)

With Linda Ronstadt
 We Ran (Elektra Records, 1998)

With Cracker
 Gentleman's Blues (Virgin Records, 1998)

With Philip Bailey
 Soul on Jazz (Heads Up International Records, 2002)

With Bad Religion
 The Empire Strikes First (Epitaph Records, 2004)
 The Dissent of Man (Epitaph Records, 2010)

With Tift Merritt
 Tambourine (Lost Highway Records, 2004)

With Rob Thomas
 ...Something to Be (Atlantic Records, 2005)

With Neil Diamond
 12 Songs (Columbia Records, 2005)
 Home Before Dark (Columbia Records, 2008)
 Dreams (Columbia Records, 2010)

With Dixie Chicks
 Taking the Long Way (Columbia Nashville, 2006)

With The Dandy Warhols
 ...Earth to the Dandy Warhols... (Beat the World, 2008)

With Susanna Hoffs
 Someday (Baroque Folk, 2012)

With Chris Hillman
 Bidin' My Time (Rounder Records, 2017)

With David Garfield
 Outside the Box (Creatchy Records, 2018)

With Chris Stapleton
 Starting Over (Mercury Records, 2020)

Campbell also played on "My Sweet Passion", theme of Amy Rose from the 1998 video game Sonic Adventure.

References

External links 
The Dirty Knobs – Mike Campbell's side-band.
DMC TV Mike Campbell – Campbell's custom Duesenberg guitar.
"Rig Rundown – Tom Petty and the Heartbreakers' Mike Campbell," by Jason Shadrick for Premier Guitar, January 27, 2013.
Long-form interview with Mike Campbell on the Myth vs. Craft podcast.

1950 births
Living people
American rock guitarists
American male guitarists
Lead guitarists
Record producers from Florida
People from Panama City, Florida
People from Jacksonville, Florida
Guitarists from Florida
Tom Petty and the Heartbreakers members
Mudcrutch members
Fleetwood Mac members
20th-century American guitarists